David Ramsey (born 1971) is an American actor.

David Ramsey may also refer to:

Dave Ramsey (born 1960), American radio show host and businessman
David Ramsey (musician) (1939–2008), organist for the Memphis Redbirds

See also
David Ramsay (disambiguation)
David Rumsey (disambiguation)